Holy Names High School (often abbreviated HNH), is a Catholic secondary school located in Windsor, Ontario, Canada.  It belongs to the Windsor-Essex Catholic District School Board. It serves students from grades 9 to 12.

History
The school opened on September 12, 1985 in the former St. Hubert Elementary School. The school was named to remember the contributions of the Sisters of the Holy Names of Jesus and Mary.  In September 1986 the school was moved to its current location, the former Centennial Secondary School. As of that month it had 36 teachers and 510 students in grades 9 and 10; it would later introduce grades 11 and 12. The dedication was scheduled for September 18, 1986. 

In the 2017–2018 school year, the school began a STEM (Science, Technology, Engineering, Math) program. The program was designed to get more students interested in the STEM subjects and to fill similar type jobs by introducing more STEM subjects and embedding them into the existing curriculum. Students who complete four years of the STEM program will be awarded with a specialized certificate. $600,000 was invested to redesign six science labs along with another $1.8 million to construct an artificial turf field and six-lane track. 

The Boys Football Team achieved back to back OFSAA championships, winning the Western Bowl in 2017 and the Northern Bowl in 2018.

In 2011, former Holy Names teacher Father William Hodgson Marshall pled guilty to sexually abusing students during his time at the school. Starting in 1952, Marshall sexually abused students at various Catholic high schools in Windsor, Sudbury and Toronto, with his last known act occurring in 1986.

Notable alumni

Eddie Francis - former mayor of Windsor
Michael Leighton - former NHL player of the Chicago Blackhawks, Nashville Predators, Philadelphia Flyers, and Carolina Hurricanes
Matt Morencie - former CFL player of the Winnipeg Blue Bombers
Jason Spezza - NHL player of the Toronto Maple Leafs
Tessa Virtue - 2010 & 2018 Winter Olympics, Ice Dance gold medallist
Daniel Victor - singer/songwriter of Neverending White Lights
Jordan Nolan - AHL player of the San Antonio Rampage, signed with St. Louis Blues
Brett Bellemore - former NHL player of the Carolina Hurricanes
Dakoda Shepley - football player and actor
D. J. Smith - head coach of the Ottawa Senators
Scott D'Amore - professional wrestler, trainer, manager, promoter and agent
Rob Raco - Actor - Riverdale

See also

List of high schools in Ontario

References

External links
School Profile
Holy Names High School

Windsor-Essex Catholic District School Board
High schools in Windsor, Ontario
Bill 30 schools
Educational institutions established in 1985
1985 establishments in Ontario